Yves Cornic-Dumoulin (Île-de-Bréhat, 23 July 1731 - Île-de-Bréhat, 11 April 1801) was French naval officer and admiral.

Cornic-Dumoulin took part in the Battle of Groix.

Sources and references 

 Fonds Marine. Campagnes (opérations ; divisions et stations navales ; missions diverses). Inventaire de la sous-série Marine BB4. Tome premier : BB4 1 à 482 (1790-1826) 

French military personnel of the French Revolutionary Wars
French naval commanders of the Napoleonic Wars
1801 deaths
1731 births